Shahdagh Qusar FK (Azerbaijani: Şahdağ Qusar FK) is an Azerbaijani football club based in Qusar, that currently takes part in Azerbaijan First Division.

History
The club was founded in 1950 and prior to 1998, called "Nefteqaz". In 2003, club was renamed to Shahdag-Samur. Firstly the team participated at Soviet Second League in 1990 and 1991 seasons. Shahdag also was among 26 participating teams at first football championship of independent Azerbaijan. During the 1990s, the club stopped existence twice because of the financial problems and most recently refounded in 2000.

Crest and colours
In 2013, the club unveiled an official crest, designed by Azerbaijani graphic designer Toghrul Babayev.

League and domestic cup history

Current squad

References

External links
 FK Shahdag Qusar at PFL.AZ

Football clubs in Azerbaijan
Association football clubs established in 1950
1950 establishments in Azerbaijan
Defunct football clubs in Azerbaijan
Association football clubs disestablished in 2017
2017 disestablishments in Azerbaijan